

Cities in the Park was a two-day music event held on the 3rd and 4th of August 1991 at Heaton Park in Manchester, England. It was held in honour of Factory Records producer Martin Hannett, who had died in April. Some profits from ticket sales went to African Famine Relief and the Kurdish Trust Fund.

The first day included performances by The Wonder Stuff and Orchestral Manoeuvres in the Dark, and the second featured many Factory acts such as Happy Mondays, Electronic and A Certain Ratio. Frank Sidebottom also made an appearance. A home video of highlights, which was filmed on super 8 film, was released by Palace in November 1991. It can be viewed online on the BFI player The bands credited on the tickets were as follows:

Saturday 3rd
The Wonder Stuff
Beautiful South (pulled out - did not play)
The Soup Dragons (pulled out - did not play)
Orchestral Manoeuvres in the Dark
Cabaret Voltaire
The Buzzcocks
The Railway Children
Ruthless Rap Assassins
Paris Angels
Ashley & Jackson
Amok
The Fall
New Fast Automatic Daffodils (played Saturday 3rd not Sunday)

Sunday 4th
Happy Mondays
Electronic
De La Soul
A Certain Ratio
Revenge
New Fast Automatic Daffodils
The Durutti Column
The Wendys
808 State
The Adventure Babies
Cath Carroll
Natural Life

Video
A Certain Ratio — "Wonder Y"
New Fast Automatic Daffodils — "Fishes Eyes"
Durutti Column — "Fado"
Ashley & Jackson — "Come Alive"
Ruthless Rap Assassins — "Why Me"
Cabaret Voltaire — "Don't Walk Away"
Natural Life — "Strange World"
Buzzcocks — "Ever Fallen in Love (With Someone You Shouldn't've)"
Adventure Babies — "My Only Way"
Revenge — "Bleachman"
The Wendys — "Suckling"
Electronic — "Feel Every Beat"
Happy Mondays — "Kinky Afro"; "God's Cop"; "Denis & Lois"; "Wrote for Luck"

References

Rock festivals in England
Culture in Manchester
Music festivals in Greater Manchester